Darabad is a quarter in northeastern Tehran, the capital city of Iran.

Darabad is a former village and a summit on the slopes of the Alborz mountain range to the northeast of Tehran, which has become part of the Greater Tehran area as a result of rapid expansion of the Tehran metropolis. Many people use Darabad as the starting point for hiking the southern slopes of Alborz, especially in the summer.

Museum of Wildlife Natural Monuments of Iran
The Museum of Wikdlife and Natural Monuments of Iran is one of the museums of Tehran province. It is located at the beginning of Darabad and Ajudanieh streets in Museum Street. Its location was one of the palaces of Princess Fatemeh Pahlavi, which was built for guests but was never used, and after the revolution, with changes for public use, it became a museum focused on the nature of Iran. This museum was inaugurated in 1993 by the Municipality of Tehran in order to acquaint citizens with cultural and natural heritage and to recognize the importance of protecting the environment and wildlife.

In 2001, the museum sent a group of four people, including two geologists (Dr Ali Meysami and Engineer Amir Hussein Chizari), a sculptor (Siamak Khodabandeh) and a coordinator (Engineer Farhad Mehran Razi) to Deh-e Alireza, Zarand in Kerman. After exploring the Shemshak Formation to the former Jurassic age, the group took the shape of a dinosaur footprint and transferred it to the museum.

The museum became a member of the International Council of Museums (ICOM) in 1997 and, in the same year, it became the first Iranian museum to join the World Wide Web, launching the online magazine Nature and Wildlife of Iran with the support of Neda Internet Services Company. Started the computer. It is also an active member of the IUCN-CEC Commission on Education and Communication of the Museum, and actively participates in the International Meetings of ICOM in Spain and the International Union for Conservation of Nature (IUCN) in North Africa.

The museum has a two floors building with 2500 square meters of infrastructure on a land area of 12,000 square meters, and has several sections, which are:

Aquatic, Birds and Mammals Section
 Salon of European, Asian and North American specimens with species of deer, North American brown bear and mouse, Asian and Siberian birds and tigers.
 Two salons of specimens of mammals, birds and aquatic animals of Iran with species of deer, whole and ram, pheasant, bear, leopard, jackal, fox, wolf and feline small and large.
 Salon of specimens of mammals and birds of the African continent.
 Salon of aquatics and reptiles which are live and taxidermy.
 Large live cat cages, such as Persian leopards and African lions and leopards, and small bird and mammal cages inside the exhibition grounds and on the museum grounds.

In the Geology Section, the characteristics of different geological periods from the first eras to the present have been exhibited from the point of view of the animal and plant environment along with hundreds of samples of rocks, minerals and fossils of Iran.

The Butterflies Salon has specimens of different types of butterflies, spiders, tarantulas and scorpions.
In the Taxidermy Workshop, in addition to the taxidermy of the specimens under the supervision of the international master of this art, Dr Hedayatollah Tajbakhsh, how to preserve the specimens of organisms is also exhibited. Live animal touch workshops are set up for students during the Children and Nature Festival and throughout the year.

Museum activities include:

 Publication of many useful books in the field of environment for children and adolescents as well as for academic reference. Including the collection "My Beautiful Animals", "Fish of Inland Waters of Iran", Ecology.
 Training classes for students in different age groups are held during the summer in collaboration with NGOs and active volunteers to increase environmental awareness.
 Child and Nature Festival, which is held on the occasion of International Children's Day for a week. During this period, with free entry for children, happy and fun programs with an educational focus on environmental protection are held for them.
 World Museum Day, with free admission for the general public.
 The International Cartoon Festival of Man and Nature with the theme of global protection of the earth and the environment, which was held with the active participation of internationally renowned cartoonists.
 Holding nature tours with a focus on education and public awareness to protect the environment.

The museum library, with more than 15,000 volumes of books in specialized fields related to the environment, is one of the most prestigious libraries of plant, animal and geological sciences in Tehran. This library is located at the entrance of the museum for easy access to the general public and is the first public library in Iran that since 1997 has provided the possibility of access and use of the Internet.

There is a veterinary clinic next to the museum to examine and treat various pets. The clinic also sells a variety of pets, including birds, squirrels, rabbits, dogs and cats, turtles, and a specialist veterinarian.

One of the special features of this museum is having live animal parts such as birds, reptiles and amphibians, aquatic animals, mammals, especially large cats, and in the non-living part, the rare species of Mazandaran tiger skin that has become extinct and its skin specimens in accordance with CITES regulations. Also, two examples of the rarest and most beautiful endangered mammals, with the names of Persian zebra and Asiatic cheetah, are displayed in it.

References

Mountains of Tehran Province
Geography of Tehran
Neighbourhoods in Tehran
Museums in Tehran
Mountains of Iran